This is the results breakdown of the local elections held in the Canary Islands on 26 May 1991. The following tables show detailed results in the autonomous community's most populous municipalities, sorted alphabetically.

Overall

City control
The following table lists party control in the most populous municipalities, including provincial capitals (shown in bold). Gains for a party are displayed with the cell's background shaded in that party's colour.

Municipalities

Arona
Population: 25,018

Las Palmas de Gran Canaria
Population: 373,846

San Cristóbal de La Laguna
Population: 118,548

Santa Cruz de Tenerife
Population: 222,892

Telde
Population: 78,978

Island Cabildos

See also
1991 Canarian regional election

References

Canary Islands
1991